Caspian people are an ancient people living on the southern and southwestern shores of the Caspian Sea.  

Caspian people may also refer to the following:

Speakers of the northwest Iranian Caspian languages, including Taleshi, Gilaki, Mazandarani and related dialects

See also
Caspian (disambiguation)
Caspian race
Mazanderani people
Gilaks